Isak Ahrling (born March 23, 1992) is a Swedish professional ice hockey player. He played with Modo Hockey in the Elitserien during the 2010–11 Elitserien season.

References

External links

1992 births
Living people
Modo Hockey players
Swedish ice hockey defencemen
Sportspeople from Umeå